Dovera is a comune (municipality) in the Province of Cremona in the Italian region Lombardy, located about  southeast of Milan and about  northwest of Cremona.

Dovera borders the following municipalities: Boffalora d'Adda, Corte Palasio, Crespiatica, Lodi, Monte Cremasco, Pandino, Spino d'Adda.

References

Cities and towns in Lombardy